The Harpur Trust is a charity in Bedford, England. The stated aim of the charity is to help and support the people who live in and around Bedford, and to help them improve their lives by:

 providing and promoting education
 offering help and relief to anyone who is sick, in need, in hardship or distress
 providing recreational facilities with a social welfare purpose for the people of Bedford and its surroundings.

Reorganised as a company limited by guarantee in 2012, it was previously called The Bedford Charity (The Harpur Trust) as its legal name, but was most often referred to as the Harpur Trust.

The main activities of the charity are the operation of a number of independent schools and one academy in Bedford. The charity also operates a number of almshouses in the Bedford area. In addition, the charity supports the community by giving grants to local projects. In 2009/10 it donated over £1,900,000 in grants to projects based in and around Bedford. This money is intended to help local organisations and individuals to make a difference to their own lives or those of others.

History
The Harpur Trust was established by Sir William Harpur (c.1496–1574). Harpur was a merchant from Bedford who became Lord Mayor of London in 1561. He was knighted in the following year. It was to support free schooling, dowries for poor maidens and “poore chylders ther to be nurryshed and enformed”. In 1566, the Bedford Charity endowed Bedford School, which had been established in 1552, and founded "the Writing School" (later renamed Bedford Modern School) to teach copper plate handwriting. In 1764, the Harpur Trust was formally created by Act of Parliament. It was not until 1882 that girls' education was endowed by the trust.

Present day

Schools
Today the Harpur Trust runs a range of fee-charging private schools:
 
 Bedford School for boys
 Bedford Modern School, co-educational 
 Bedford Girls' School (The school was founded in 2010 as the result of the merger between Dame Alice Harpur School and Bedford High School)
 Pilgrims Pre-Preparatory School, co-educational

It is these schools run by the Bedford Charity that make Bedford famous for the quality of its private education . In March 2009, the charity confirmed it would enter the state education sector with the opening of a new academy in Bedford: Bedford Academy opened in September 2010, sponsored by the charity along with Bedford College.

Other activities
The Harpur Trust also owns almhouses in Bedford and the nearby village of Bromham. The Charity's endowment was valued at £53.9 million in June 2010 and it employs over 1,200 people in Bedford. Its current Chief Executive is David Steadman.

References

External links
Official site
Harpur Trust page from the Charity Commission – includes links to annual reports

Private schools in the Borough of Bedford
1566 establishments in England
Charities based in Bedfordshire
Educational charities based in the United Kingdom
Charities for the elderly based in the United Kingdom